Rainer Schüttler and Yen-Hsun Lu were the defending champions.   Schüttler partnered with Alexander Waske this year, losing in the semifinals.  Lu did not participate.

Michal Mertiňák and Petr Pála won in the final 6–2, 7–5, against Prakash Amritraj and Rohan Bopanna.

Seeds

Draw

Draw

External links
Draw

2006 Chennai Open
2006 ATP Tour
Maharashtra Open